Māngere Arts Centre - Ngā Tohu o Uenuku is an Auckland Council-owned and operated arts venue in the suburb of Māngere, in Auckland, New Zealand. The purpose-built facility was opened in 2010, and is considered by Auckland Council to be the home of Māori and Pacific visual art and performing arts in Auckland.

Facility 
The centre was purpose-built, and opened in September 2010 by Manukau City Council.  It is now both owned and operated by Auckland Council. The venue includes two gallery spaces, totalling 217m2, and a 230-seat theatre. In addition to the 390m2 performance space, there are a 56m2 studio space, three dressing rooms and a Green Room. An enclosed courtyard is used for outside performances. The facility also has a community kitchen and a cafe.  Attendance in 2018 and 2019 was more than 36,000 people annually.

Since 2013, Alison Quigan has been the Performing Arts Manager at the centre.

Programme 
The theatre produces an annual school holiday production in the April school holidays.

Selected productions 

 Kila Kokonut Krew, Taro King by  Vela Manusaute (2012), celebrating the tenth anniversary of the Kila Kokonut Krew.
Mirror Mirror directed by Troy Tuua and produced by Mangere Arts Centre (2017). The production won an Excellence Award for Overall Production at the 2017 Annual Auckland Theatre Awards.
Moana (June 2019) Pacific Dance Festival, choreographed by Ankaramy Fepuleai, Manoa Teaiwa, Tofifailauga Misa, Lyncia Muller and the New Zealand School of Dance.

Selected exhibitions 

 Sopolemalama Filipe Tohi: Fatuemaka mei falekafa: Sopolemalama Filipe Tohi.Survey part one (2011).
Pacific Sisters: Pacific Sisters SOUTHSIDE: EyeKonik, as part of the 2011 Pacific Arts Summit.
Ioane Ioane: I will sea you in Hawaiki (2012) 
Chris Charteris and Jeff Smith: Tungaru; The Kiribati Project (2014).
 Malama Papau, Kolokesa Uafā Māhina-Tuai, Lopiani Papau & Violeta Papau: Kolose, the Art of Tuvalu Crochet. (2014).
Charlotte Graham, Kaitiaki. (2015).
Gavin Hipkins, Erewhon. (2015).
Bethany Edmunds, Te Kōpū, (2018).

References

External links 
Māngere Arts Centre Facebook page

Theatres in Auckland
Art galleries in New Zealand
Māngere-Ōtāhuhu Local Board Area
Art museums and galleries in Auckland